Joan Y. Reede (born 1953) is an American physician. She is Harvard Medical School's inaugural dean for diversity and community partnership, and a member of the National Academy of Medicine. She is known for creating programs that mentor and support minority physicians and female physicians. Alumni of her programs have created a 501(c)(3) organization called The Reede Scholars in her honor.

Early life and education 
Reede was born and raised in Boston, the descendant of slaves from Georgia. Despite discouragement from school officials, she applied to and attended Brown University and graduated in 1977, then went on to Mt. Sinai School of Medicine, graduating in 1980. Reede's mother, Tommye Loretta Reede, eventually earned her college degree the same year that Reede graduated from medical school. Reede then moved to Johns Hopkins University School of Medicine to complete a residency in pediatrics before completing a fellowship in child psychiatry at Boston Children's Hospital. Reede returned to school at Harvard later in her career, earning a Master's of Public Health degree in 1990 and a Master's in Policy and Management in 1992, both from the Harvard School of Public Health. She also holds an MBA from Boston University.

Career and research 
Reede began her career in community health in Boston, working with incarcerated youth and children in public schools. Throughout her career, she has worked on various efforts to educate teachers and students about health issues. She has also been on several advisory councils for the National Institutes of Health.

While a student and fellow at Harvard, where she moved in 1989, Reede co-founded its Biomedical Sciences Career Program, which disseminates information about careers to young students of color, and connects them with mentors. In 2001, she was appointed to the new position of dean for diversity and community partnership at Harvard, the first African-American woman dean at Harvard Medical School. She also founded a physician fellowship program for postgraduate education in working with minority and disadvantaged patients. Her other programs at Harvard aim to bring more women and people of color into biomedical careers. In 1990 she initiated the Minority Faculty Development Program at Harvard Medical School, which supports the career development of minority faculty. Since 1990, the share of full-time minority HMS faculty, including black, Hispanic, Native American, Asian, and Pacific Islanders, has risen from 10 percent to nearly 25 percent, including more than 700 underrepresented minority faculty. She has also initiated three leadership fellowship programs in health policy.  Alums of these programs formed a 501(c)(3) alumni association, The Reede Scholars, which is focused on improving human health and wellbeing and to transform health policy through education, research, policy and practice. She has also created research fellowships for Harvard Medical School faculty and for minority postdoctoral researchers.

In 2002 she founded a 501(c)(3) organization, the Biomedical Science Careers Program, that seeks to increase the representation of minorities in the biomedical and biotechnology fields while helping health care institutions, biotechnology firms, and educational institutions recruit a diverse workforce.  This program is funded by an annual gala dinner, Evening of Hope. Reede also organizes the annual New England Science Symposium, which highlights the research performed by minority scientists at many career stages, from undergraduate to post-doctoral.

Her research focuses on national, regional and local strategies that support workforce diversity and inclusion in the biomedical sciences and organizational change. She has performed research on the importance of networking in career progression for medical school faculty and on the barriers that face women, and women of color, in academic medical careers.  She has also studied gender and race differences in the receipt of NIH grant awards.

Building community 
Reede has worked to develop community norms at Harvard Medical School and beyond, developing award programs to recognize efforts in community service, exceptional service by staff, and contributions to mentoring.  She has also championed internship programs that offer opportunities to underrepresented students.

National roles 
Reede's advice is frequently sought at the national level. She has served on the Committee on Minority Health and the Advisory Committee to the Director of the National Institutes of Health, the Board of Governors of the National Institutes of Health Clinical Center, and the External Scientific Panel for NIH’s Enhancing the Diversity of the NIH-funded Workforce Initiative. She has also served on the Advisory Committee to the NIH Deputy Director for Intramural Research. She is a past Chair of the Group on Diversity and Inclusion (GDI) at the Association of American Medical Colleges, and of the National Academy of Medicine Interest Group on Health Populations/Health Disparities.

Honors and awards 
 1986: Health Award, Boston NAACP
 1993: Community Service Award, Epilepsy Association of Massachusetts
 1996: Exemplary Models of Administrative Leadership Award, American Association of University Administrators
 1998: Dean's Award for the Support and Advancement of Diversity Harvard Medical School
 1998: CDC/University of California Public Health Leadership Institute Scholar Centers for Disease Control
 2002: Leadership Award National Dental Association
 2003: Changing the Face of Medicine, Celebrating America’s Women Physicians National Library of Medicine
2004: Diggs Lecture, National Institutes of Health
 2005: Herbert W. Nickens Award, Society of General Internal Medicine
 2005: Herbert W. Nickens Award, Association of American Medical Colleges
 2005: Academic Leadership in Primary Care Award, Morehouse School of Medicine
 2007: Riland Medal for Public Service, New York College of Osteopathic Medicine
 2007: Honorary Doctorate, New York Institute of Technology
 Board of Directors, National Hispanic Medical Association
 2009: Member, National Academy of Medicine
 2011: Diversity Award, Association of Professors of Medicine
2012: Elizabeth Beckman Hurlock Award, Elizabeth Hurlock Beckman Award Trust
2015: Jacobi Medallion, Icahn School of Medicine at Mount Sinai
2016: Health Equity Hero, Delta Dental
 2017 Commitment to Diversity award, Xconomy
 2018 Heroes in Health Care award, Visiting Nurse Association.
 2019 NEHI Innovator in Health Award, Network for Excellence in Health Innovation.

References 

1953 births
Living people
Harvard Medical School faculty
American child psychiatrists
Harvard Medical School people
21st-century American women physicians
21st-century American physicians
Brown University alumni
Boston University School of Management alumni
Harvard School of Public Health alumni
African-American women physicians
American women academics
21st-century African-American women
21st-century African-American physicians
20th-century African-American people
20th-century African-American women
Members of the National Academy of Medicine